Pant Glas (Welsh for Green Hollow - in Welsh, as in other Celtic languages, "glas" may mean both 'green' and 'blue') is a hamlet on the A487 road in Gwynedd, Wales, in the community of Clynnog. Nearby is the former Pant Glas railway station on the closed Carnarvonshire Railway. The station closed in January 1957. The railway closed in 1964 and has since been replaced with the Lôn Eifion cycle track. Also nearby is the Arfon transmitting station, the tallest structure in Wales.

Welsh opera singer Bryn Terfel was brought up at Fferm Nant Cyll Ucha, located just outside the hamlet.

References

External links 

Villages in Gwynedd
Clynnog